Katarina Asplund (1690-1758), was a Finnish pietist. She was a leading figure within the pietism movement in Österbotten and known as a visionary. Because of her visionary activity, she was often in conflict with the authorities on charges of blasphemy.

References

Further reading  
  

1690 births
1758 deaths
18th-century Finnish people
18th-century Finnish women